Michigan's 61st House of Representatives district (also referred to as Michigan's 61st House district) is a legislative district within the Michigan House of Representatives located in part of Macomb County. The district was created in 1965, when the Michigan House of Representatives district naming scheme changed from a county-based system to a numerical one.

List of representatives

Recent Elections

2020

2018

2016

2014

2012

2010

2008

Historical district boundaries

References 

Michigan House of Representatives districts
Kalamazoo County, Michigan